A city with special status, formerly a "city of republican subordinance", is a type of first-level administrative division of Ukraine. Kyiv and Sevastopol are the only two such cities. Their administrative status is recognized in the Ukrainian Constitution in Chapter IX: Territorial Structure of Ukraine and they are governed in accordance with laws passed by Ukraine's parliament, the Verkhovna Rada. Most of Ukraine's 27 first-level administrative divisions are oblasts (regions).

Overview
Although Kyiv is the nation's capital and its own administrative region, the city also serves as the administrative center for Kyiv Oblast (province). The oblast entirely surrounds the city. In addition, before 2020 Kyiv also served as the administrative center for the oblast's Kyiv-Sviatoshyn Raion (district).

Sevastopol is also administratively separate from the Autonomous Republic of Crimea, retaining its special status from Soviet times as closed city, serving as a base for the former Soviet Black Sea Fleet. The city was home to the Ukrainian Navy as well as the Russian Black Sea Fleet, although since the Crimean crisis, both Crimea and Sevastopol were annexed by Russia as federal subjects, a move declared illegal by both the Ukrainian government and a majority of the international community.

List of cities

Historic predecessors

Similar status existed at times of the Russian Empire and many of them were located on shores of Black Sea. Among the first city municipalities that were established on territory of modern Ukraine in the beginning of 19th century were Odessa, Taganrog and Feodosia.
 Odessa  (1803–1838, 1856–1920)
 Feodosiya (1804–1829)
 Kerch-Yenikale (1821–1920)
 Izmail (1830–1835)
 Sevastopol (1872–1920), in 1805–1864 part of Mykolaiv military govtenorate
 Mykolaiv (1900–1917), in 1805–1900 as a separate wmilitary govtenorate
 Yalta (1914–1917)
 Taganrog (1802–1887), Taganrog and its vicinities were taken away from Ukraine in 1925 after signing of the 1922 Union treaty.

References

External links
 

 
Special status
Ukraine, National Cities
Special status
Subdivisions of Ukraine
Ukraine 1
Ukraine